Amar Praner Swami is a 2007 Bangladeshi romantic film directed by P. A. Kajol. It stars Shakib Khan, Shabnur, Nipun & many more. It was released on 10 August 2007 throughout Bangladesh. The film became the highest grossing Bangladeshi film of 2007.

For the film Khan received his first Meril Prothom Alo Awards for Best Actor in Critics Choice category for his role Raju.

Plot

Cast
 Shakib Khan as Raju
 Shabnur
 Nipun Akter
 Don
 Sadek Bachchu
 Omar Sani

Music
The film's music was directed by Alluddin Ali.

Sound track

Awards and nominations
 Meril Prothom Alo Awards for Best Actor (critics choice) - Shakib Khan (won)

References

2007 films
2007 romantic drama films
Bengali-language Bangladeshi films
Bangladeshi romantic drama films
Films scored by Alauddin Ali
2000s Bengali-language films